Igor Vasilyevich Kurchatov (12 January 1903 – 7 February 1960), was a Soviet physicist who played a central role in organizing and directing the former Soviet program of nuclear weapons. 

As many of his contemporaries in Russia, Kurchatov, initially educated as a naval architect, was an autodidact in nuclear physics and was brought by Soviet establishment to accelerate the feasibility of the "super bomb". Aided by effective intelligence management by Soviet agencies on American Manhattan Project, Kurchatov oversaw the quick development and testing of the first Soviet nuclear weapon, which was roughly based on the first American device, at Semipalatinsk in Kazakhstan in 1949. 

Kurchatov, a recipient of many former Soviet honors, had a instrumental role in modern nuclear industry in Russia but his health decline rapidly that is mainly attributed to a 1949 radiation accident in Chelyabinsk-40 (a much more serious than Chernobyl in 1986). Kurchatov died in Moscow in 1960, aged 57.

Biography

Kurchatov was born in a small village in Simsky Zavod in Ufa, Russia (now it is a town of Sim, Chelyabinsk Oblast), on 12 January 1903. His father, Vasily Alekseyevich Kurchatov, was a surveyor and former forester's assistant at the Ural Mountains; his mother, Mariya Vasilyevna Ostroumova, a daughter of the parish priest at Sim, was a school teacher. He was an elder and second of three children of Vasily Kurchatov, and the family moved to Simferopol in Crimea in 1912. The Kurchatov were of Russian ethnicity. 

After his older sister, Antonina, passed away in Crimea, Igor grew up with his younger brother, Boris, where they both attended the Simferopol gymnasium №1, and was a Mandolin player at his school's orchestra. During the World War I, Igor and Boris had to work to support the family, becoming the skilled welder and developed interests in the steam engines, wishing to become an engineer. 

Kurchatov attended the Crimea State University where he studied physics and had built a reputation for his mechanical ability to perform physics experiment, for which he was titled as a doctorate. Kurchatov soon moved to Baku in Azerbaijan after securing physics assistance job at the Azerbaijan Polytechnic Institute. There, he presented his experiments in electrical conduction, which impressed Dr. Abram Ioffe who was there as a guest, and invited him to Physico-Technical Institute in Saint Petersburg, Russia. Kurchatov married Marina Sinelnikova in 1927 and they did not have children.

While working under Ioffe on ferroelectricity and semiconductors, Kurchatov entered in Leningrad Polytechnic Institute to study engineering and secured his engineer's degree in naval architecture in 1930s. In 1937, Kurchatov was a part of the team that designed and built the first cyclotron particle accelerator in Russia, which was installed in Radium Institute. Installation was finished in 1937, and research began to take place on 21 September 1939. During this time, Kurchatov was consider to be studied aboard in physics at the Lawrence Berkeley National Laboratory in the United States but the plan fell through due the political reasons. Until 1933, Kurchatov did not go into the nuclear physics and his work was primarily focused on electromagnetism but did an important work on nuclear isomer and radioactivity in 1935.

In 1940, Kurchatov moved to Kazan and raised objection on Spontaneous fission when Georgy Flyorov directed a letter about the discovery. In 1942–43, Kurchatov found a project with the Soviet Navy and moved to Murmansk where he worked with fellow physicist Anatoly Alexandrov. By November 1941, they had devised a method of demagnetizing ships to protect them from German mines, which was in active use until the end of World War II and thereafter. The job with Soviet Navy solved Kurchatov's objection on spontaneous fission when he wrote in 1944: "Uranium must be separated into two parts at the moment of detonation. At breaking up of kernels in a kilogram of uranium, the energy released must be equal to the explosion of 20,000 tons of TNT equivalent."

Soviet program of nuclear weapons

After 1942, Kurchatov oversaw the facility expansion and overall development of Russian program in the Soviet Union, from military to civilian dimension of the nuclear program. Kurchatov is widely known as father of Soviet program of nuclear weapons, and often is compared to American Robert Oppenheimer— although Kurchatov was not a theoretical physicist. 

The Soviet establishment did not started the program until 1943 despite receiving intelligence from Russian spies in the United States and a warning from Georgii Flerov. Kurchatov, as many others, was working with towards building ammunition for Red Army's campaign against the German forces in Eastern Front of the World War II. Initially, the Soviet establishment asked Abram Ioffe to lead the Soviet program of nuclear weapons, which he denied but recommended Kurchatov in 1942. Kurchatov established the Laboratory No. 2 in Moscow by bringing Abram Alikhanov (who worked on heavy water production) from Armenia and Lev Artsimovich who was instrumental in electromagnetic isotope separation. Initially, Kurchatov insisted working without foreign data on isotope separation and was aimed to producing material using the gas centrifuges but Soviet Union was years behind before the gas centrifuge machine would be available. Facing a tighter deadline from Stalin, Kurchatov relied upon the foreign data by choosing the Gaseous diffusion method to produce the fissile material, a move that irked Pyotr Kapitsa who raised objections against it but was dismissed.

During the early years, the Soviet program suffered with many setbacks due to logistical failures and commitment from Soviet establishment but received full support under the atomic bombings of Hiroshima and Nagasaki in Japan. In 1942, he was informed of results obtained from Chicago Pile-1 by the Soviet intelligence, and provided his view of making a nuclear bomb. In 1945, Kurchatov became involved in designing and building the first reactor at Laboratory No. 2 which sustained the nuclear chain reaction in late 1946. Together with Alikhanov and Flerov, Kurchatov authored a paper on the production of plutonium in uranium graphite reactor. In 1947, Kurchatov worked with Isaak Kikoin to verify the calculations of the foreign data received on the American program.

In 1946, the Soviet program was aggressively pursued under Lavrenty Beria who (like Kapitsa) had a conflict with Kurchatov over his reliance on design data provided by Klaus Fuchs, a German physicist in the American Manhattan Project, to meet the Stalin's deadline. The design of the first Soviet nuclear device town of Sarov in the Gorki Oblast (now Nizhny Novgorod Oblast), on the Volga, and renamed it Arzamas-16. Kurchatov recruited Dr. Yulii Khariton (who first resisted but joined the program) and Yakov Zel'dovich, and Kurchatov vigorously defended their deuterium calculations, insisting that the data could not be more accurate on cross section estimates.

The team was assisted by public disclosures made by the US government as well as by further information supplied by Fuchs. However, Kurchatov and Beria feared that the intelligence was disinformation and so insisted for the scientists retest everything themselves. Beria, in particular, would use the intelligence as a third-party check on the conclusions of the teams of scientists.

RDS-1

The Russian spies in the United States greatly aided in providing the key data on American nuclear devices, which allowed Kurchatov to avoid time-consuming and expensive trial and error problems. The fissile material was obtained from using the gaseous diffusion and implosion-type plutonium core where Kurchatov spent most time. Furthermore, the German nuclear physicists were instrumental in speeding the acquisition of device data, and were employed under Kurchatov's guidance.

Final device assembly was oversaw by Dr. Yulii Khariton who had a device moved in knock-down subassembly in Semipalatinsk in Kazakhstan.

On 29 August 1949, Kurchatov and his team successfully detonated its initial test device RDS-1 (a plutonium implosion bomb) at the Semipalatinsk Test Site– the device was codenamed RDS-1 (РДС–1) by Kurchatov which was approved by Soviet establishment. Kurchatov later remarked that his main feeling at the time to be one of relief.

In 1950, the work on thermonuclear weapon was started with Khariton, Sakharov, Zel'dovich, Tamm, and others working under Kurchatov's leadership at Arzamas-16. Kurchatov aided in calculations but most work was done by Vitaly Ginzburg, Andrei Sakharov, Khariton, and Zel'dovich who had the most credit in developing the design for the thermonuclear device, known as RDS-6, which was detonated in 1953.

By the time RDS-1 exploded, Kurchatov had decided to work on the nuclear power generation, working closely with engineer Nikolay Dollezhal, that would established the Obninsk Nuclear Power Plant, near Moscow. The site was opened in 1954, which was known for its kind and was the first nuclear power plant in the world. His knowledge on naval architecture undoubtedly helped him in designing the first civilian nuclear ship, the Lenin.

After Stalin's death and execution of Beria, Kurchatov began to speak about dangers of nuclear war, of nuclear weapon testing and visited England where he was of the view of greater interaction between Russian and Western scientists on nuclear fusion applications.

Death

In January 1949, Kurchatov had been involved in a serious radiation accident which became a catastrophe at Chelyabinsk-40 in which it is possible that even more people died than at Chernobyl. In an effort to save the uranium load and reduce losses in the production of plutonium, Kurchatov, without proper safety gears, was the first to step into the central hall of the damaged reactor full of radioactive gases. After 1950, Kurchatov's health sharply declined and a suffered a stroke in 1954 and died in Moscow of a cardiac embolism on 7 February 1960 aged 57. He was cremated and his ashes were buried in the Kremlin Wall Necropolis on Red Square.

Legacy and honors

During his time in Soviet nuclear program, Kurchatov swore he would not cut his beard until the Soviet program succeeded, and he continued to wear a large beard (often cut into eccentric styles) for the remainder of his life, earning him the nickname "The Beard". Kurchatov was a communist who had a portrait of Stalin by the time he died, and a member of Communist Party of the Soviet Union.

Two towns bear his name: Kurchatov Township in Kazakhstan, and Kurchatov near Kursk (the site of a nuclear power station), the Kurchatov Institute is named in his honour, and bears a large monument dedicated to him at the entrance. The crater Kurchatov on the Moon and the asteroid 2352 Kurchatov are also named after him.

For his part in establishing the Soviet nuclear program, in accordance with state decree 627-258, Kurchatov was awarded the title of Hero of Socialist Labor, the Stalin Prize First Class, the sum of 500,000 rubles (besides the earlier results of (50%) premium in the amount of 500,000 rubles) and a ZIS-110 car, a private house and cottage furnished by the state, a doubling of his salary and "the right (for life for him and his wife) to free travel by rail, water and air transport in the USSR". In all, he was:

Member of the Soviet Academy of Sciences (elected in 1943)
Three times Hero of Socialist Labor (1949, 1951, 1954)
Awarded five Orders of Lenin 
Awarded two Orders of the Red Banner
Awarded the following medals: "For Victory over Germany", "For the defense of Sevastopol"
Four times recipient of the Stalin Prize (1942, 1949, 1951, 1954) 
Recipient of the Lenin Prize (1957).

Kurchatov was buried in the Kremlin Wall in Moscow, a burial place reserved for top Soviet officials. In 1960 his institute was renamed to the I.V. Kurchatov Institute of Atomic Energy, and in 1991 to the Russian Research Centre Kurchatov Institute. The Kurchatov Medal was established by the Academy of Sciences for outstanding work in nuclear physics. In the Transfermium Wars element naming controversy, the USSR's proposed name for element 104 was "kurchatovium", Ku, in honor of Kurchatov. Element 104 is now known as rutherfordium.

References

Further reading
 Dark Sun: The Making Of The Hydrogen Bomb by Richard Rhodes
 PBS documentary Citizen Kurchatov

 S. P. Korolev. Encyclopedia of life and creativity - edited by C. A. Lopota, RSC Energia. S. P. Korolev, 2014

External links

 Kurchatov institute
 Biography of Igor Kurchatov (in Russian)
 Annotated bibliography of Igor Kurchatov from the Alsos Digital Library

1903 births
1960 deaths
People from Ashinsky District
People from Ufimsky Uyezd
Peter the Great St. Petersburg Polytechnic University alumni
Russian expatriates in Azerbaijan
Russian communists
Russian engineers
Soviet physicists
Soviet engineers
Soviet  inventors
Russian nuclear physicists
Nuclear weapons program of the Soviet Union
Communist Party of the Soviet Union members
Academic staff of Moscow State University
Academic staff of the Moscow Institute of Physics and Technology
Full Members of the USSR Academy of Sciences
Heroes of Socialist Labour
Stalin Prize winners
Lenin Prize winners
Recipients of the Order of Lenin
Recipients of the Order of the Red Banner of Labour
Anti-Americanism
Victims of radiological poisoning
Third convocation members of the Supreme Soviet of the Soviet Union
Fourth convocation members of the Supreme Soviet of the Soviet Union
Fifth convocation members of the Supreme Soviet of the Soviet Union
Burials at the Kremlin Wall Necropolis